The M1941 Johnson Light Machine Gun, also known as the Johnson and the Johnny gun, was an American recoil-operated light machine gun designed in the late 1930s by Melvin Johnson. It shared the same operating principle and many parts with the M1941 Johnson rifle and the M1947 Johnson auto carbine.

Design 
The M1941 light machine gun was designed by a Boston lawyer and captain in the Marine Corps Reserve named Melvin Johnson Jr. His goal was to build a semi-automatic rifle that would outperform the M1 Garand the US Army had adopted. By late 1937, he had designed, built, and successfully tested both a semi-automatic rifle and a prototype light machine gun. Each shared a significant number of physical characteristics and common parts, and both operated on the principle of short recoil with a rotating bolt. He took the parts of other guns, switching them out and creating the M1941 light machine gun.

Johnson's curved, single-column magazine attached to the left side of the receiver; company brochures list a 20-round magazine as standard. Additionally, the weapon could be loaded by stripper clip at the ejection port, or by single rounds fed into the breech. The rate of fire was adjustable, from 200 to 600 rounds per minute. Two versions were built: the M1941 with a wooden stock and a metal bipod, and the M1944 with a tubular steel butt and a wooden monopod.

The design intended the recoil forces to travel, along with the mass of the weapon's moving parts, in a direct line to the shoulder of the gunner. While this design minimized muzzle climb, the sights had to be placed higher above the bore.

The weapon has many parallels with the German FG 42. Both feed from the left side, and both fire from an open bolt while in automatic, and a closed bolt while in semi-auto. Both weapons were awkward to carry loaded, with a side-mounted magazine; the Johnson had an especially lengthy single-column magazine, and this feature tended to unbalance the weapon. Despite these similarities, there is no evidence that either weapon had any effect on the design of the other. Both weapons attempted to solve similar problems, and adopted similar solutions.

Prototypes of semi-automatic rifles, 20-round magazine-fed, based on the Johnson LMG were also produced. The M1947 Johnson auto carbine is an example. A belt fed variant also existed.

Deployment 
Johnson sold small quantities of the Johnson LMG to the U.S. Army and Marine Corps.

During the Second World War, special forces within the Allies demanded a more portable, lighter, more accurate automatic rifle that provided the equivalent stopping power of the American BAR. As a result, this machine gun was adapted as the BAR replacement for commandos operating behind Axis lines. The First Special Service Force, raised jointly with men from both Canada and the United States (the famous Devil's Brigade), traded the Marine Corps 125 of the new Johnson light machine guns for plastic explosives. They were used in lieu of BARs, but as they wore out and were lost in combat they were replaced by BARs.

The Johnson LMG was used by the Philippine Army and Philippine Constabulary during World War II under the Japanese Military Occupation from 1942 to 1945 and post-war from 1945 to 1960s including during the Hukbalahap Rebellion (1946-1954) and by the Philippine Expeditionary Forces to Korea or PEFTOK (1950-1955).

Shortly after the 1948 Arab-Israeli War, the predecessor of the Israel Defense Forces, Haganah, developed a close copy of the Johnson LMG, the Dror, in both .303 British and 7.92×57mm Mauser.  Israeli forces found the Dror prone to jam from sand and dust ingress, and the weapon was discontinued after a brief period of service. Ernesto "Che" Guevara notably used a Johnson in the Cuban Revolution.

Aftermath 
Melvin Johnson continued to develop small arms. In 1955, he was asked to assist Fairchild/ArmaLite in (unsuccessfully) promoting Eugene Stoner's AR-10 rifle with the U.S. Department of Defense, then with ArmaLite and Colt's Manufacturing Company as an advocate for the AR-15. Armalite relied heavily on Johnson's efforts and the AR-15 used a similar bolt design to the M1941 Johnson. The AR-15 is still produced today by numerous manufacturers, as is its derivative, the M16 rifle. One of Johnson's last postwar firearms ventures was a 5.7 mm-caliber version of the M1 carbine, aka 'the Spitfire'.

Liquid propellant prototype 
A prototype using hydrazine for a caseless firearm was also developed. The firearms would have been very effective and pretty equivalent in performance to conventional propellants, while offering improved supply lines. The main concern was in the durability of pressure seals in field conditions as well as toxicity of the substance to the user.

Users 

: Known to be used by Canadian soldiers in the Special Service Force
: Formerly used by the Royal Malaysian Police, now on display at the Police Museum.

Non-state actors
 26th of July Movement

See also 

Dror
Sturmgewehr 52
Kg/1940 Light machine gun
FG 42
Furrer M25
List of individual weapons of the U.S. Armed Forces
M60 machine gun
Model 45A
M1946 Sieg automatic rifle
MG 30
TRW Low Maintenance Rifle

Notes

Books and References 
Johnson Jr., Melvin, Rifles and Machine Guns of the World's Armies, Fighting Forces, 1944.
Smith, Joseph E., Small Arms of the World, Stackpole Books, 1969.
Weeks, John, WWII Small Arms, Galahad Books, 1980.
Barnes, Frank C., Cartridges of the World, DBI Books, 1989.
Pikula, Sam (Maj.), The Armalite AR-10, 1998.
Canfield, Bruce N., Johnson Rifles and Machine Guns, Mowbray Publishing, 2002.

External links 
 
 
 

.30-06 Springfield battle rifles
.30-06 Springfield machine guns
Firearms by Melvin Johnson
Light machine guns
Short recoil firearms
Weapons and ammunition introduced in 1940
Weapons of the Philippine Army
World War II battle rifles
World War II machine guns
World War II firearms of the United States